The vielle  is a European bowed stringed instrument used in the medieval period, similar to a modern violin but with a somewhat longer and deeper body, three to five gut strings, and a leaf-shaped pegbox with frontal tuning pegs, sometimes with a figure-8 shaped body. Whatever external form they had, the box-soundchest consisted of back and belly joined by ribs, which experience has shown to be the construction for bowed instruments. The most common shape given to the earliest vielles in France was an oval, which with its modifications remained in favour until the Italian lira da braccio asserted itself as the better type, leading to the violin.

The instrument was also known as a fidel or a viuola, although the French name for the instrument, vielle, is generally used; the word comes from the same root as fiddle.  It was one of the most popular instruments of the medieval period, and was used by troubadours and jongleurs from the 13th through the 15th centuries. The vielle possibly derived from the lira, a Byzantine bowed instrument closely related to the rebab, an Arab bowed instrument. There are many medieval illustrations of different types of vielles in manuscripts, sculptures and paintings.

Starting in the middle or end of the 15th century, the word vielle was used to refer to the hurdy-gurdy, as a shortened form of its name: ''vielle à roue ("vielle with a wheel").

Several modern groups of musicians have formed into bands to play early music (pre-Baroque), and they sometimes include vielles, or modern reproductions, in their ensembles, together with other instruments such as rebecs and saz.

Gallery

References

External links 
 Vielles (Polish folk musical instruments)
 Vielles (Musiconis Database, Université Paris-Sorbonne)

Bowed string instruments
Necked lutes
Early musical instruments
Medieval musical instruments